Seaxburh (died c. 674) was a queen of Wessex. She is also called Queen of the Gewisse, an early name for the tribe which ruled Wessex. She is said to have ruled Wessex for between one and two years after the death of her husband, Cenwalh, in 672. Her accession to the throne is documented in the Anglo-Saxon Chronicle for that year which states that 'This year king Kenwalk died, and Sexburga his queen reigned one year after him'. It was extremely rare for a woman to rule in her own right in Anglo-Saxon England, and she was one of the only women to appear in a regnal list. She may have ruled for over a year, as the next reign is entered in the Anglo-Saxon Chronicle in 674.

However, Bede said that after death of Cenwalh "sub-kings took upon themselves the government of the kingdom", so the chroniclers may have tidied up a complicated situation.  Writing decades after Cenwalh's life,  when Bede lists Cenwalh's accession, he mentions Seaxburh as the unnamed second wife whom the king married after he had cast away his first wife, who was the sister of the Mercian king Penda.  It has been suggested that Bede deliberately omitted mention of Seaxburh because he viewed her marriage to Cenwalh, and therefore her right to the throne, as illegitimate.

Seaxburh was succeeded in about 674 by Æscwine, a descendant of Cenwalh's great-uncle Ceolwulf of Wessex.

See also
House of Wessex family tree

Notes

External links
 

670s deaths
West Saxon monarchs
Queens regnant in the British Isles
7th-century English women
7th-century English people
7th-century women rulers
7th-century English monarchs
Year of birth unknown
House of Wessex